Lockhart Tea Park is a tea valley located in the Munnar-Thekkedy road in Munnar, Kerala. The valley is adjacent to Chokarmudy Hill and Devimalai Hill.

Tea production
Munnar